Gogawan is a village in Khargone district in the state of Madhya Pradesh, India. This village is situated on the banks of the Weda River. Gogawan had a population of 18,000. The town is surrounded by hundreds of very small villages and so is the main market area for those villages. On every Tuesday people from all these villages come to purchase their weekly required materials, whereas on Sunday most of the shops remain closed.

Demographics

As of the 2011 Census of India, males constitute 50.86% of the population, females average 49.14%.  Gogawan has an average literacy rate of 78.83%. This is higher than the national average of 74.04%: male literacy is 85.91%, and female literacy is 71.63%.

Education
Gogawan does not have any colleges but there are some schools in town.

Higher secondary schools
 Government Boys Higher Secondary School
 Government Girls Higher Secondary School

High schools
 Bapna Public School, Gogawa

Other schools
 The First Step Public School
 Shanti Shiksha Niketan School
 Devanshu Public School
 Nizamiya Public School
 Sandipani Public School
 St. Umar Convent School
 Gurukul Public School
 Priyadarshini Public School
Sanjari public school (Director- Mohammad idris

Villages in Gogawan block

References

Khargone district